Dominique Mocka (born 13 August 1978)  is an association footballer from Guadeloupe. Mocka can operate in midfield or as a forward and currently plays for JS Vieux-Habitants and the Guadeloupe football team. He is the brother of fellow Guadeloupe and JS Vieux-Habitants striker Erick Mocka.

Club playing career

Racing Club de Basse-Terre

Mocka began his career in 1994 with Racing Club de Basse-Terre. He spent nine years and most of his career at the club, winning the Guadeloupe Division d'Honneur in the 2003–04 season, his penultimate year at Basse-Terre. With Basse-Terre, Mocka was the league's top scorer in two consecutive seasons, firstly in 2002–03, with 18 goals, as Racing Club finished eighth  and then in 2003–04, with 20 goals, as his team won the league title.

Association de la Jeunesse Sportive Saintoise

Dominique spent a year at the club after leaving Racing Club de Basse-Terre in 2005. Jeunesse finished seventh in the 2005/06 Guadeloupe Division d'Honneur during Dominique's time at the club, and he scored eleven times, but lost out in the goalscoring charts to his brother, Erick Mocka, who scored fifteen times. In 2006, Mocka moved on to JS Vieux-Habitants.

JS Vieux-Habitants

Mocka currently plays for Guadeloupe top-flight club JS Vieux-Habitants and is the team's player/coach. He has been at Vieux-Habitants since 2006, but his most successful year at the club to date was 2010, when Vieux-Habitants won the league and Mocka scored 13 league goals.

International career

Dominique has been capped thirty-eight times for his country, scoring seventeen goals. He wears the no. 5 shirt for Guadeloupe, a number that is usually worn by a central defender. Mocka played in the 2003 CONCACAF Gold Cup preliminary qualifiers against Puerto Rico on 7–21 July 2002. He then also featured in the group stage qualifying match against Jamaica on 11 November, against Barbados on 13 November, against Trinidad & Tobago on 28 March 2003 and against Antigua & Barbuda on 30 March. Dominique scored twice in ten minutes in the match against Antigua & Barbuda as Guadeloupe as his team won 2–0.

Mocka played for Guadeloupe at the 2007 Gold Cup. Mocka made his only appearance in the tournament in the 1–1 draw with Haiti in June 2007, coming on as a second-half substitute.

His next recent call-up for Les Gwada Boys came over three years later, on 7 December 2010, against Jamaica. Mocka played twice more that year, against Antigua and Barbuda and Cuba.

The midfielder was recalled to the Guadeloupe national team in October 2012, making three appearances at the 2012 Caribbean Cup. Mocka scored a first-half brace in the 4–1 win over Puerto Rico on 26 October 2012; these were his first international goals for nine years.

Management career

In 2010, Mocka took charge of the Guadeloupe U20 team when they began competing for the first time since 1992. He was appointed joint-manager along with Steve Bizasene. Mocka said that he would put an emphasis on selecting locally based players for the team.

Honours

 2002–03 Guadeloupe Division d'Honneur - topscorer
 2003–04 Guadeloupe Division d'Honneur - topscorer
 2003–04 Guadeloupe Division d'Honneur - champions
 2003–04 Coupe de Guadeloupe           - champions
 2009–10 Guadeloupe Division d'Honneur - champions

See also 
 List of top international men's football goalscorers by country

References

Living people
1978 births
Guadeloupean footballers
Guadeloupe international footballers
Racing Club de Basse-Terre players
Guadeloupean football managers
Association football midfielders